Yaoundé Airport  is an airport in Yaoundé, the capital of Cameroon and a city in the Centre Province. It is also known as Yaoundé Ville Airport. It should not be confused with Yaoundé Nsimalen International Airport

See also
 Cameroon Air Force
 List of airports in Cameroon
 Yaoundé Nsimalen International Airport

References

Airports in Cameroon
Buildings and structures in Yaoundé